Picturehouse Cinemas is a network of cinemas in the United Kingdom, operated by Picturehouse Cinemas Ltd and owned by Cineworld. The company runs its own film distribution arm, Picturehouse Entertainment, which has released acclaimed films such as David Lowery's A Ghost Story, Sally Potter's The Party and Francis Lee's God's Own Country, Custody, Capernaum and The Wife. A previous iteration of this distribution arm, which focused largely on alternative content, was sold in 2017 to Howard Panter and Rosemary Squire and rebranded as Trafalgar Releasing.

The first cinema in the chain, Phoenix Picturehouse, opened in Oxford in 1989, but many of the others operated independently before then: the Duke of York's Picture House in Brighton, for example, opened in 1910 and is Britain's longest continually operating cinema.

On 17 March 2020, Picturehouse and all other movie cinema companies in the UK temporarily closed their UK cinemas, due to the COVID-19 pandemic, reopening them on 31 July. A second closure took place from 9 October 2020 until 17 May 2021, due to an insufficient amount of new film releases and a second wave of the pandemic closing indoor venues.

On 7 September 2022, Cineworld filed for Chapter 11 bankruptcy in the United States.

Locations

Current

Former

Planned

Industrial action

In 2014, Cineworld was subject to industrial action owing to its refusal to pay the London living wage to its staff. Started by workers at the Ritzy Cinema, Brixton the resulting Ritzy Living Wage campaign attracted the support of Eric Cantona and Terry Jones.

Industrial action resumed in October 2016 over the issue of the Living Wage, as well as recognition of the theatre union BECTU, parental pay and sick pay, and has spread to six Picturehouse cinemas, making it the biggest strike action ever by cinema workers in the UK. Staff at the Ritzy Cinema are represented by BECTU while other cinemas were represented by the Picturehouse Staff Forum, a company union set up by management in 2003 and later run by Picturehouse staff.

Strikes continued into 2018, when workplace reps were found to be unfairly dismissed and were instructed to be reinstated, meanwhile Picturehouse claimed that they are one of the highest payers in the UK cinema industry. 

In 2019, following a membership vote, the Staff Forum (run by Picturehouse management) was dissolved and later removed by the Certification Officer from the official list of trade unions. BECTU also called off the company boycott stating "BECTU members have now agreed to suspend our Living Staff Living Wage campaign and call off the public boycott to focus on fighting for equal pay at the Ritzy and continuing to challenge the dismissal of other members. We won’t rest until Ritzy and Picturehouse follows suit with other cinema employers we have successfully worked with and treats all its workers fairly." As of 2022, Picturehouse cinemas still do not pay their frontline staff living wage.

References

External links
 

1989 establishments in England
Cinema chains in the United Kingdom
Entertainment companies established in 1989
Organizations established in 1989
2012 mergers and acquisitions
Companies that filed for Chapter 11 bankruptcy in 2022